Inanidrilus speroi is a species of annelid worm. It is known from subtidal carbonate sands in the Bellairs Reef, Barbados, in the Atlantic Ocean. Preserved specimens measure  in length.

References

speroi
Fauna of Barbados
Taxa named by Christer Erséus
Fauna of the Atlantic Ocean
Animals described in 1984